Best Balıkesir Basketbol Kulübü, more commonly known as Best Balıkesir is a Turkish professional basketball club based in Balıkesir which plays Turkish Basketball First League (TBL). The team was founded as Potanın Yıldızları Basketbol Kulübü in 2004. Their home arena is Kurtdereli Sports Hall with a capacity of 2,000 seats. The team sponsored by Best A.Ş. of Yırcalı Group which is an energy company in Turkey.

Logos

Season by season

Players

Current roster

External links 
 Best Balıkesir Basketbol Kulübü, official website
 Eurobasket.com page
 Twitter page
 Facebook page
 Instagram page

Basketball teams in Turkey
Basketball teams established in 2004
2004 establishments in Turkey
Sport in Balıkesir